A Woman Who Understood is a 1920 American silent drama film, directed by William Parke, distributed by Robertson-Cole, and starring Bessie Barriscale.

Plot
As described in a film magazine, Madge Graham (Barriscale), a sculptress who pays for her art work by conducting a tea room in Greenwich Village, New York City, saves violinist Robert Knight (Stanley) during an attempted suicide by throwing a tea cup through his window. She learns that he is despondent over a rejection by the young woman he loves and from losing his position in an orchestra. Her efforts get him his place back with the orchestra and they are married. Her interest in their children leads him to seek appreciation of his talent elsewhere, and he goes to his former sweetheart who is now Mrs. Alden (Cumming). In a fire he burns his hands. Mrs. Alden declines to offer her skin for an operation to save his hands, but when his wife consents he sees that she really understands him.

Cast
 Bessie Barriscale as Madge Graham
 Forrest Stanley as Robert Knight
 Dorothy Cumming as Mrs. Alden
 Thomas Holding as Mr. Alden
 Stanton Williams as Bobbie Knight
 Mary Jane Irving as Peggy Knight
 Gloria Holt as Marion Alden
 Joe Butterworth as Jimmy

Preservation status
This film is now considered a lost film.

References

External links
 
 
 Period advertising; lobby poster

1920 films
American silent feature films
Lost American films
1920 drama films
Silent American drama films
American black-and-white films
Film Booking Offices of America films
Films directed by William Parke
1920 lost films
Lost drama films
1920s English-language films
1920s American films